Daniil Artemovych Savin (born 29 June 2005) is a Ukrainian professional footballer who plays as a right winger for Ukrainian club Mariupol.

References

External links
 Profile on Mariupol official website
 
 

2005 births
Living people
Place of birth missing (living people)
Ukrainian footballers
Association football forwards
FC Mariupol players
Ukrainian Premier League players